Gueskerou is a village and commune in southeastern Niger. As of 2011, the commune had a total population of 40,886 people.

References

Communes of Niger